Judge Dee at Work is a collection of gong'an detective short stories written by Robert van Gulik and set in Imperial China (roughly speaking the Tang Dynasty). It is a fiction based on the real character of Judge Dee (Ti Jen-chieh or Di Renjie), a county magistrate and statesman of the Tang court, who lived roughly 630–700.

The book features eight illustrations by the author.

The book also has a postscript where the author places all the novels and stories into a coherent timeline for his semi-fictional character.

Overview
Judge Dee, a magistrate in Imperial China is a crime solver, a detective. In these stories Judge Dee solves a series of un-related crimes from different times in his career. There is no over-all narrative to these stories.

List of stories
 "Five Auspicious Clouds" - set in the year 663 when Judge Dee was a magistrate of Peng-lai.
 "The Red Tape Murder" - set in the year 663 when Judge Dee was a magistrate of Peng-lai.
 "He Came With the Rain" - set in the year 663 was a magistrate of Peng-lai.
 "The Murder on the Lotus Pond" - set in the year 666 when Judge Dee was a magistrate of Han-yuan.
 "The Two Beggars" - set in the year 668 when Judge Dee was a magistrate of Poo-yang.
 "The Wrong Sword" - set in the year 668 when Judge Dee was a magistrate of Poo-yang.
 "The Coffins of the Emperor" - set in the year 670 when Judge Dee was a magistrate of Lan-fang.
 "Murder on New Year's Eve" - set in the year 670 when Judge Dee was a magistrate of Lan-fang.

1967 short story collections
Judge Dee
Gong'an novels
Heinemann (publisher) books